Teresa Victoria "Terri" Hoyos is an American actress and former makeup artist.

Early life
Hoyos was born and raised in Los Angeles, California and is of Mexican descent and is the daughter of actor Rodolfo Hoyos Jr., aka Rodolfo Hoyos. In the 1980s, she began her career as a makeup artist, and later trained in acting at LACC Theatre Arts Academy.

Career
Hoyos made her screen debut in 1984, with a small part in the film Crimes of Passion, and later had guest starring roles on Hill Street Blues, Gimme a Break!, Cheers, ER, Dharma & Greg, Frasier, NYPD Blue, Parks and Recreation, and Modern Family. She also had a recurring role as Rosa Valens in the CBS procedural Cold Case (2009–2010). She was a regular cast member on the Fox sitcom The Ortegas in 2003. The series was canceled before its debut. In 2014, she was cast in the ABC comedy series Cristela. In 2020, she appeared as Victor's grandma in Love, Victor.

Filmography

Film

Television

References

External links

1952 births
Living people
20th-century American actresses
21st-century American actresses
Actresses from Los Angeles
American television actresses